James Leatham Birley  (1884–1934) was a British physician and neurologist, known for his work on fatigue and stress in WWI pilots.

Biography
After education at Winchester College, James Birley matriculated at University College, Oxford, where he graduated in 1908 with a first-class degree in natural science. He then studied medicine at St Thomas's Hospital Medical School. In 1911 he qualified from the University of Oxford BM Pathology and BM Forensic Medicine and Public Health. He graduated BM BCh (Oxon.)in 1912 and qualified MRCP in 1913. He held house appointments at St Thomas's Hospital and at the National Hospital for Diseases of the Nervous System, Queen Square. In 1915 he joined the Royal Army Medical Corps. During WWI he was stationed in France with the Royal Flying Corps from 1916 to 1919.

In 1920 he became a member of the War Office Committee of Enquiry into 'Shell-Shock', publishing their final report in 1920.

By 1921 Birley had graduated MD (Oxon.) and had published an article, co-authored by Leonard S. Dudgeon, in the journal Brain. At St Thomas's Hospital Birley was appointed assistant physician in 1919 and in 1928 full physician and director of the neurological department (as successor to Sir Farquhar Buzzard). Birley worked at St Thomas's Hospital until his death in 1934. He was simultaneously an assistant physician at the National Hospital, Queen Square for a few years.

On 11 August 1922 he married Margaret Edith Mercer, née Tennant. She was born in 1890 and was the widow, married in 1913, of Major Archibald Ariel Mercer (1884?–1914) and daughter of William Augustus Tennant of Ugley, Essex. There were two sons and a daughter from the marriage. The younger son was James Leatham Tennant Birley.

Awards and honours
 1919 — FRCP
 1919 — CBE
 1920 — Goulstonian Lecturer

Selected publications

References

1884 births
1934 deaths
20th-century English medical doctors
British neurologists
People educated at Winchester College
Alumni of University College, Oxford
Alumni of St Thomas's Hospital Medical School
Physicians of St Thomas' Hospital
Fellows of the Royal College of Physicians
Commanders of the Order of the British Empire
Royal Army Medical Corps officers